The Lankford coefficient (also called Lankford value, R-value, or plastic strain ratio) is a measure of the plastic anisotropy of a rolled sheet metal.  This scalar quantity is used extensively as an indicator of the formability of recrystallized low-carbon steel sheets.

Definition 

More recent studies have shown that the R-value of a material can depend strongly on the strain even at small strains  .  In practice, the  value is usually measured at 20% elongation in a tensile test.

For sheet metals, the  values are usually determined for three different directions of loading in-plane ( to the rolling direction) and the normal R-value is taken to be the average 

This quantity is defined as

Anisotropy of steel sheets 

In such cases, any press-forming process design on the basis of  does not lead to an improvement in deep-drawability.

See also 
 Yield surface

References

Plasticity (physics)
Solid mechanics
Metal forming